Jangid is a Hindu Brahmin surname of Rajasthan origin. Jangid also known as Jangid brahmin is a subcaste of the Adi Gaur (गौड़) Brahmins. Nowadays, this surname is also used by Vishwakarma caste people. They have a notable presence in the states of Haryana, Rajasthan (63%) and Punjab and their traditional occupation was that of carpentry, especially woodcarving and furniture making. Today, the Jangid in Rajasthan are usually known for painting and decorative works such as making seats or chariots for religious figurines.

Notable people
 Ravi Jangid, cricketer
 Payal Jangid, activist

References

Artist castes